Bicton Baths is a popular swimming location on the Swan River in Western Australia commonly used by prawn hunters, diving trainers, swimming lessons, sport, leisure and for annual events.

Formally known as Bicton River Jetty, and Jetty 1248, it is known to the local Aboriginal people, the Whadjuk Noongar people, as Kwoppa Kepa, meaning 'beautiful water' in Noongar.

Bicton Baths were initiated by the local Melville Amateur Swimming Club, a group who had previously utilised the jetty of the quarantine station jetty as a platform. In 1946 the Melville Water Polo Club was founded at the baths, a move which resulted in the Bicton Pool being built in 1979.

The baths themselves consist of a wooden U-shaped jetty which contains exit ladders. Bicton baths is located in a tidal gorge and is heavily influenced by ocean water inflow. It contains a variety of wildlife, including algae, anemones, crabs, dolphins, fish, nudibranchs, shrimp, sponges and starfish.

References

Swan River (Western Australia)
Bicton, Western Australia